In military terms, 155th Division or 155th Infantry Division may refer to:

 155th Division (People's Republic of China)
 155th Infantry Division (Wehrmacht)
 155th Reserve Panzer Division (Wehrmacht)
 155th Infantry Division Emilia (Italian, World War II)
 155th Division (Imperial Japanese Army)